Rodolfo Rojas D.T. was a 1997-1998 Argentine telenovela, starring , China Zorrilla, Pepe Soriano and Patricia Sosa. It lasted for two seasons. Carlos Calvo plays the main character, Rodolfo Rojas, a football manager (D.T. is an acronym in Spanish for "Director técnico", a football manager). It got five nominations to the Martín Fierro award, all of them unsuccessful.

External links
 

Pol-ka telenovelas
Sports fiction
1997 Argentine television series debuts
1998 Argentine television series endings
Television shows set in Buenos Aires